Chapter Nine refers to a ninth chapter, but the term could also refer to:

Chapter 9 (American Horror Story), 2016 episode of American Horror Story
 "Chapter 9: The Marshal", an episode of the second season of The Mandalorian
Chapter 9, Title 11, United States Code, chapter of the United States Bankruptcy Code
Chapter nine institutions, group of organisations